Vivien may refer to:

 Vivien (name), variant spelling
 Vivien, Western Australia, an abandoned town in Australia
 , a British destroyer launched in 1918 and sold in 1947 for scrapping

See also 
 Saint-Vivien (disambiguation)
 Vivienne
 Vivian (disambiguation)
 Viviana (disambiguation)